A Family is a 2004 South Korean drama film starring Soo Ae and Joo Hyun, and written and directed by Lee Jung-chul.

Plot
Jeong-eun, a former pickpocket with four prior convictions, is released from prison after serving a three-year sentence. She reunites with her younger brother, Jeong-hwan, and father, Ju-seok, the latter with whom she has a troubled relationship. Ju-seok, an ex-cop-turned-fishmonger, hides his love and concern for his daughter beneath a gruff exterior. Though Jeong-eun is tough and rebellious, she is fiercely protective of her brother and father, and is genuinely determined to put her life in order this time. While under probation, she works as an assistant at a beauty salon, hoping to someday open her own salon with the money she has saved. But Chang-won, who was once her partner in crime and now leads his own gang, not only refuses to give Jeong-eun her cut of their last job, but he and his gangsters begin harassing her family, saying she's the one who owes him money.

Cast
Soo Ae as Jeong-eun 
Joo Hyun as Ju-seok
Park Ji-bin as Jeong-hwan
Park Hee-soon as Chang-won 
Uhm Tae-woong as Dong-su
Jung Wook as Byeong-cheon
Chu Gwi-jeong as beauty salon owner
Jeon Guk-hwan as Man-sik
Kim Se-dong as probation officer

Awards and nominations

References

External links
 

South Korean drama films
2004 films
2000s South Korean films